This is a timeline of women's suffrage in New Mexico. Women's suffrage in New Mexico first began with granting women the right to vote in school board elections and was codified into the New Mexico State Constitution, written in 1910. In 1912, New Mexico was a state, and suffragists there worked to support the adoption of a federal women's suffrage amendment to allow women equal suffrage. Even after white women earned the right to vote in 1920, many Native Americans were unable to vote in the state.

1890s 
1893

 The Albuquerque Suffrage Club is organized to work for women's suffrage in the territory of New Mexico.

1899

 Carrie Chapman Catt is working to organize suffragists in Santa Fe.

1910s 
1905

 The Woman's Club of Albuquerque celebrates Susan B. Anthony's 85th birthday.

1910

 August: The Women's Christian Temperance Union (WCTU) in New Mexico holds the first public debate on women's suffrage in the state.
 November 21: Ratification of the New Mexico State Constitution. Originally, it included limited provisions for women voting, but this was eventually rejected.

1912

 New Mexico becomes a state, but Native Americans are still not allowed to vote. Women can only vote in school board elections.
1914

 The Congressional Union sends their first organizer, Mabel Vernon, to New Mexico.
 May Jessie Hardy Stubbs organizes a suffrage demonstration in Santa Fe and helps create the New Mexico Women's Suffrage League.

1915
 October 15: suffrage parade of around 150 women marched through Santa Fe to the home of Senator Thomas Benton Catron to demand women's suffrage.
1916

 October: California suffragist, Dr. Jessie A. Russell, tours New Mexico to support suffrage through the Republican Party.
 Senator Andrieus A. Jones becomes chair of the Senate's Woman Suffrage Committee in the Senate.

1917
 Suffragist Adelina Otero Warren is asked to take charge of the New Mexico chapter of the Congressional Union.
 April Santa Fe chapters of NAWSA and the National Women's Party (NWP) educate women voters and encourage them to vote in the upcoming school board election.

1920s 
1920
 January: The New Mexican Republican Party sends Nina Otero-Warren the Republican Conference in Denver as their representative to the Republican Women's Committee.
 February 21: New Mexico is the 32nd state to ratify the 19th Amendment.
 March: The Woman's Party creates an all-female ticket.
 The New Mexico chapter of NAWSA disbands and creates the League.
1922

 Former suffragists form the New Mexico League of Women Voters with Ina Sizer Cassidy as the first president. .

1924

 The Indian Citizenship Act allowed Native Americans who did not live on reservations in New Mexico the right to vote.

1940s 
1948

 All Native Americans gain the right to vote in New Mexico after the court case of Trujillo v. Garley which was brought by Michael Trujillo.

See also 

 List of New Mexico suffragists
 Women's suffrage in New Mexico
 Women's suffrage in the United States

References

Sources 

 
 
 
 

New Mexico suffrage
Timelines of states of the United States
Suffrage referendums